Nedumankuzhy Paulose Basil, (born 20 October 1996) commonly known as NP Basil is an Indian cricketer who plays for Kerala in domestic cricket. He is a right-handed medium-pacer.

Domestic career
Basil was born on 20 October 1996 in Perumbavoor in Ernakulam district of Kerala. He started his cricketing career at Perumbavoor Cricket Club and later moved to Ernakulam District Academy. He has represented Kerala in all age-group levels. 

He made his first-class debut for Kerala on 27 January 2020 in the 2019–20 Ranji Trophy. He played two matches in the tournament and took four wickets with a best bowling figure of 3/54 against Vidarbha. He made his List A debut on 20 February 2021 for Kerala in the 2020–21 Vijay Hazare Trophy. His best-bowling figure (3 for 57 in eight overs) from the tournament came against Karnataka in a losing cause. He played 5 matches in the tournament and took 5 wickets. 

He played for KCA Eagles in the 2020–21 season of KCA President's Cup T20.

References

External links
 

1996 births
Living people
Indian cricketers
Kerala cricketers